Sonchalida is a  village in Bhatar CD block in Bardhaman Sadar North subdivision of Purba Bardhaman district in the state of West Bengal, India.

History
Census 2011 Sonchalida Village Location Code or Village Code 319771. The village of Sonchalida is located in the Bhatar tehsil of Burdwan district in West Bengal, India.

Demographics
The total geographic area of village is 161.56 hectares. Sonchalida features a total population of 1,896 peoples. There are about 420 houses in Sonchalida  village.

Population and house data

References 

Villages in Purba Bardhaman district